Leptospermum trinervium, commonly known as flaky-barked tea-tree, slender tea-tree or paperbark tree, is a species of shrub or small tree that is endemic to eastern Australia. It has papery bark that is shed in thin, flaking layers, narrow elliptic to broadly egg-shaped leaves with the narrower at the base, white flowers and silky-hairy fruit that falls from the plant when mature.

Description
Flowering mostly occurs from September to October near the coast and from November to December on the tablelands.

Taxonomy
This tea-tree was first described in 1790 by James Edward Smith who gave it the name Melaleuca ? trinervia and published the description in John White's Journal of a Voyage to New South Wales.

Distribution and habitat
Flaky-barked tea-tree mainly grows in forest but is also found in heath and scrub, especially among sandstone rocks. It occurs on the coast and tablelands south from Rockhampton in Queensland through eastern New South Wales to near coastal scrubland and woodland in far eastern Victoria.

Use in horticulture
Leptospermum trinervium is a hardy, although not showy plant, the bark being its most unusual feature. It can be propagated from seed or from cuttings and is frost hardy.

References

trinervium
Myrtales of Australia
Flora of New South Wales
Flora of Queensland
Flora of Victoria (Australia)
Plants described in 1790
Taxa named by James Edward Smith